Glide is a  3D graphics API developed by 3dfx Interactive for their Voodoo Graphics 3D accelerator cards. Although it originally started as a proprietary API, it was later open sourced by 3dfx. It was dedicated to rendering performance, supporting geometry and texture mapping primarily, in data formats identical to those used internally in their cards. Wide adoption of 3Dfx led to Glide being extensively used in the late 1990s, but further refinement of Microsoft's Direct3D and the appearance of full OpenGL implementations from other graphics card vendors, in addition to growing diversity in 3D hardware, eventually caused it to become superfluous.

Glide wrappers and emulators 
Glide emulator development has been in progress since the late 1990s. During 3dfx's lifetime, the company was aggressive at trying to stop these attempts to emulate their proprietary API, shutting down early emulation projects with legal threats. However, just before it ceased operations and had its assets purchased by Nvidia, 3dfx released the Glide API, along with the Voodoo 2 and Voodoo 3 specifications, under an open source license, which later evolved into an open source project.

See also 
 Vulkan (API)
 3dfx Interactive
 MiniGL
 Mantle (API) – another low-level API

References

External links 
 Glide SourceForge Project
 GLIDE programming manual
 Glide Wrappers List
 OpenGL Documentation

3D computer graphics
3D graphics APIs
3dfx Interactive
Application programming interfaces
Cross-platform free software
Free 3D graphics software
Graphics libraries
Video game development software